Royal Shrewsbury School Boat Club (RSSBC) is a rowing club based on the River Severn at Shrewsbury School Boathouse, Kingsland, Shrewsbury, Shropshire, West Midlands.

History
The boat club was founded in 1866 and is owned by Shrewsbury School with rowing being a primary school sport due to its location on the River Severn.

The club has won the prestigious Princess Elizabeth Challenge Cup at the Henley Royal Regatta on four occasions and has won both the Queen Mother Challenge Cup at the National Schools' Regatta (three times) and the Schools' Head of the River Race eights (four times).

In 1982 the Club was the first to be undefeated in Schools rowing in a single season,  winning The Schools' Head of The River, Queen Mother Challenge Cup at National Schools' Regatta and Henley Royal Regatta. They won the Special Race For Schools at Henley Royal Regatta but had defeated Eton College, the winners of the Princess Elizabeth Challenge Cup at Henley Royal Regatta in all of their races that year.

Pengwern Rowing Club
The Pengwern Boat Club shares the same stretch of the river and is located immediately to the west of the RSSBC.

Honours

National Schools' Regatta

Henley Royal Regatta

Schools' Head of the River Race

British champions

References

Sport in Shropshire
Rowing clubs in England
Rowing clubs of the River Severn
Shrewsbury
Scholastic rowing in the United Kingdom
Sport in Shrewsbury